Kretschmann cabinet may refer to:

 First Kretschmann cabinet, Baden-Württemberg state government 2011-2016
 Second Kretschmann cabinet, Baden-Württemberg state government 2016-2021
 Third Kretschmann cabinet, Baden-Württemberg state government since 2021